Forkhead box C1, also known as FOXC1, is a protein which in humans is encoded by the FOXC1 gene.

Function 

This gene belongs to the forkhead family of transcription factors which is characterized by a distinct DNA-binding fork head domain.  The specific function of this gene has not yet been determined; however, it has been shown to play a role in the regulation of embryonic and ocular development.

Heart development and somitogenesis 
FOXC1 and its close relative, FOXC2 are both critical components in the development of the heart and blood vessels, as well as the segmentation of the paraxial mesoderm and the formation of somites. Expression of the Fox proteins range from low levels in the posterior pre-somitic mesoderm (PSM) to the highest levels in the anterior PSM. Homozygous mutant embryos for both Fox proteins failed to form somites 1-8, which indicates the importance of these proteins early on in somite development.

In cardiac morphogenesis, FOXC1 and FOXC2 are required for the proper development of the cardiac outflow tract. The outflow tract forms from a cell population known as the secondary heart field. The Fox proteins are transcribed in the secondary heart field where they regulate the expression of key signaling molecules such as Fgf8, Fgf10, Tbx1, Isl1, and Bmp4.

Clinical significance 
Mutations in this gene cause various glaucoma phenotypes including primary congenital glaucoma, autosomal dominant iridogoniodysgenesis anomaly, and Axenfeld–Rieger syndrome type 3. FOXC1 mutations are also found in association with Dandy–Walker malformation.

Role in cancer 
FOXC1 induces the epithelial to mesenchymal transition (EMT), which is a process where epithelial cells separate from surrounding cells and begin migration. This process is involved in metastasis, giving FOXC1 a crucial role in cancer. The over expression of FOXC1 results in the up-regulation of fibronectin, vimentin, and N-cadherin, which contribute to cellular migration in nasopharyngeal carcinoma (NPC). The knockout of FOXC1 in human NPC cells down-regulated vimentin, fibronectin, and N-cadherin expression.

FOXC1 transcription factor regulates EMT in basal-like breast cancer (BLBC).  Activation of SMO-independent Hedgehog signaling by FOXC1 alters the cancer stem cell (CSC) properties in BLBC cells. These CSCs, which are regulated by FOXC1 signaling, contribute to tumor proliferation, tissue invasion, and relapse.

See also 
 FOX proteins

References

Further reading

External links 
 

Forkhead transcription factors